Combatting Cult Mind Control is a nonfiction work by Steven Hassan described as a "Guide to Protection, Rescue, and Recovery from Destructive Cults." The author discusses theories of mind control and cults based on the research of Margaret Singer and Robert Lifton as well as the cognitive dissonance theory of Leon Festinger. Park Street Press, a New Age and alternative beliefs publisher, first published the book in 1988. In 2015, Hassan's own Freedom of Mind Press issued a revised 30th anniversary edition, Combating Cult Mind Control (note different spelling), featuring Hassan's new analysis of how coercive groups use social media to gain undue influence and updates on organizations that he alleges practice mind control. The book, according to the author's website, has been re-published in seven different languages.

Hassan is a licensed mental health counselor in the Commonwealth of Massachusetts, and is a former member of the Unification Church.

Summary

Introduction

In the preface, Hassan directly addresses readers who know someone in a cult or may be in a cult themselves. He stresses that everyone needs to decide for themselves whether they are in a destructive cult and that if their group is not a mind control cult, it will stand up to criticism and examination. He suggests that people who may be in cults read the book twice, first thinking about other groups that they believe are harmful and taking notes, then thinking about their own group and comparing their thoughts to the notes they took previously.

Language Used

In the introduction, Hassan expresses discomfort with the term "deprogramming" because, though still widely considered positive by the public, it evokes images of kidnapping cult members against their will, which he no longer supports except in extreme cases. Additionally, since the first publication of his book more than 30 years ago, cults have learned the methods of deprogramming and now try to inoculate members against them by sharing deprogramming horror stories and telling them to avoid ever being alone with non-cult family members. 

Another term, "exit counseling," has its own pros and cons. While it is more voluntary, cults also warn their members against exit counseling, and the "exit" can turn off cult members who do not think they are ready to leave the destructive cult yet. In the United Kingdom, exit counseling can refer to someone who aids in end of life care, another point of confusion. Though he is uncomfortable with both terms, Hassan admits he does not have a better replacement and uses both throughout the book.

Hassan also explains his reasoning for using "Moonie" to describe members of the Unification Church, a destructive cult of which Hassan was once a high ranking member. While he was in the cult, members referred to themselves as Moonies with pride and even had the name written on shirts that they wore. Since then, the Unification Church has sued to get Moonie turned into a rude word. Hassan guesses this is part of a campaign to scare reporters away from criticizing the Unification Church and refuses to change his language. He thus uses Moonie throughout the text, to refer to himself and others.

Changes in the 2018 Edition

In the 2018 30th Anniversary Edition, Hassan has changed many instances of mind control to "undue influence." Though this emerged as a legal term, he finds it more helpful because efforts to change the minds of cult members are often not fully effective and much more easily thought of as a type of pressure or influence that makes individuals more likely to agree with cult doctrine than disagree.

Additionally, Hassan adds stories of Mormon and Scientology ex-members, which previous editions had strayed away from for fear of litigation. He notes that, because previous editions did not describe Mormonism or Scientology as destructive cults, the book was not banned by those groups and many members were able to read it.

Personal Experience with Unification Church

In the 30th Anniversary Edition, Hassan begins by describing his own personal experience with the Moonies, a destructive cult that recruited him when he was in college. After attending a three-day weekend retreat that he was told would be two days and that he was mostly unable to leave, his parents expressed concern and asked him to speak to a rabbi before moving further into what appeared to be a Christian church. The rabbi did not know that the Unification Church was a destructive cult and could not answer Hassan's questions so he decided to continue investigating on his own. When he next visited the group home, a higher ranking Moonie began to mentor him and he was an active member and leader in the cult for two years.

Sleep deprivation led Hassan to crash a car, which at the time he blamed on sleep spirits. The long recovery in the hospital away from other cult members gave him time to catch up on sleep and food. His sister, who had never criticized the cult, reached out to ask him to meet his nephew. While the Unification Church discouraged interaction with family members, they trusted Hassan enough to visit his sister, at which point she staged an intervention.

Because Hassan could not walk without crutches at the time, his family and some ex-members prevented him from leaving for six days while they talked about their negative experiences with the cult. Hassan reports that he used cult techniques like "thought stopping" to prevent himself from feeling any doubt, but on the sixth day, he realized the cult leader, Moon, was lying to them and the cult framework collapsed around him. He is grateful for his family's intervention, which took the form of a more classic cult deprogramming where the victim is not permitted to leave, but states that now he prefers voluntary methods of deprogramming that do not involve kidnapping or other crimes.

Cult Structure

Hassan's categorizes cults into four groups:
 Religious Cults: This is the type most people associate with cults. These cults focus on religious beliefs and often have a single, holy leader and prophecies of the end times.
 Political Cults: These are fringe groups focused on a political ideology, such as the Aryan Nation or now-defunct Democratic Workers Party of California.
Psychotherapy/Educational Cults: These groups tend to recruit through self-help or empowerment seminars, which often cost thousands of dollars. They ensure people have emotional breakthroughs or other "peak experiences" during recruitment so they come back for more. NXIVM was such a cult that focused on improving the mental health and relationships of its members, moving them towards "integration."
Commercial Cults: These cults focus on making money and tend to look like multi-level marketing schemes that demand their members recruit more people endlessly in order to finally make money.

Most cults have five types of members, depending on their commitment to the cult: top leaders, sub leaders, core members, rank and file members, and fringe members. 

Cults instill many doctrinal beliefs, but ten core ones, common in many cults, are:

The Doctrine is reality
Reality is black and white, good vs. evil
Elitist mentality
Group will over individual will
Strict obedience: modeling the leader
Happiness through good performance
Manipulation through fear and guilt
Emotional highs and lows
Changes in time orientation
No way out

Mind Control

Hassan defines mind control as "a system that disrupts an individual's healthy identity development." Identities are composed of beliefs, behavior, thoughts, and patterns of emotions. When cults indoctrinate a member, they replace this authentic identity with an artificial one. According to Hassan, while this can happen quickly, it generally takes days or weeks and can occur even if, at first, the individual fakes the cult identity in order to fit in, without actually believing in cult doctrine. He stresses that, while some forms of mind control or influence can be good (such as helping drug users or biofeedback), he is only referring to destructive, non-altruistic methods in his book.

According to Hassan, modern cults use mind control techniques like neuro-linguistic programming (NLP) and hypnosis to recruit members. Their recruitment techniques continue to improve over time and they now no longer target mostly college students. Anyone is a potential victim, especially those going through an emotional transition. When Hassan recruited for the Moonies, he sorted people into "thinkers," "feelers," "doers," and "believers" and tailored his approach to that designation. In this way, he—and other cult recruiters—focus on what the potential victim wants to achieve and is scared of losing to recruit them. During recruitment, Moonies also use "love bombing," or the practice of showering newcomers with compliments and attention, to keep Hassan interested in the group and scared of annoying any of the members. 

Destructive cults cultivate a fear of leaving to keep members trapped. In Hassan's case, he described members who described nightmarish experiences with deprogramming, which convinced him to cut off contact with his family and outsiders, lest they try to kidnap and deprogram him. He also describes being called a "brainwashed robot" by outsiders, but accepting it as "expected persecution," which he had been told to accept from outsiders. Insults and rude treatment by outsiders simply made him a more committed member.

Brainwashing

Hassan does not use mind control and brainwashing as synonyms. Instead, he uses brainwashing as a specific type of destructive mind control. The term, first coined in 1951 by Edward Hunter, was used to describe American prisoners of war in Korea who believed they had committed crimes and became allies of Korea instead of their home countries. Hassan believes brainwashing is "overtly coercive" and used when victims already know they are "in the hands of an enemy." Brainwashing involves abuse and often torture.

Unlike subtler cult mind control techniques, brainwashing does not tend to last when victims return to their families and a safe environment. Most mind control also does not involve physical abuse but instead relies on "group dynamics" and "hypnotic processes."

BITE Model
Hassan's four components of mind control are: behavior, information, thought, and emotion. According to his BITE model, if a destructive cult can effectively control one or more components, the others will tend to follow. For instance, restricting information can lead to control of thoughts, which can in turn lead to changed and controlled behaviors and emotions. His BITE model is based on Leon Festinger's cognitive dissonance theory, though Hassan added information as a fourth realm of control.

Behavior

Destructive cults can control behavior by manipulating the exterior environment, such as asking all members to live on a commune together, and keeping members busy. By scheduling their days, cults can also induce sleep deprivation, another form of behavior control. Many cult members must ask cult leadership for permission to leave or speak to family. Some cults ask members to donate all their money and physical possessions, making members financially reliant on the cult for everything. Destructive cults limit alone time and may even assign permanent buddies or groups. 

Hierarchical control makes praise and punishment simple. A higher up can praise a member in front of everyone, inducing pride, or claim they strayed in some way and make the whole group, including the individual, understand the need for punishment. Punishments include chores, but also fasting and staying up all night, both ways to make individuals less coherent and able to resist. 

Many cults also have their own ritual behaviors and ways to speak. These bind members as an in-group and cement outsiders as an out-group. Doing behaviors together can make people feel special, a phenomenon called "social proof."

Information

Cults control information to "rob people of the ability to make informed decisions." Cults may do this by keeping members on communes or cult property, far away from outside influences. However, even cults that do not use physical distance can control information, such as by smearing all outside sources as propaganda, satanic, or false. When cult members do have time to think or read for themselves, they are generally provided cult propaganda. 

Members are also discouraged from speaking critically about the cult to one another. Instead, members are taught to seek out higher ranking members and mentors for assistance. Contact with outside families and friends, and especially ex-members, is frowned upon as these people could most clearly articulate what the cult is doing to the new member. In some cults, letters and phone calls are screened.

Destructive cults also compartmentalize information so no one sees the big picture until they are ready. For instance, Hassan describes meeting a potential recruitee for the Moonies and asking whether he knew that Moonies bowed to a picture of their cult leader, Moon. The new recruit didn't know that yet and found it off putting. In the end, he decided he didn't want to continue interacting with the Unification Church. Had he been more indoctrinated, this additional information may not have put him off. 

Hassan describes this sectioned information as "outsider" vs. "insider doctrines, where outsider doctrines is bland and harmless and insider doctrine is only revealed when superiors decide someone is ready. Cult members can believe both insider and outsider doctrine, even if they conflict. In the Moonies, Hassan, for instance, believed that lying was a tool of Satan but that it was okay to lie to outsiders to recruit them because the ends justified the means. If cult members struggle to reconcile beliefs, they are often told that they just aren't ready to understand and if they keep working, everything will become clear.

Thought

Thought control involves members internalizing cult doctrine. Cult doctrines are often absolutist, making all issues two sided, with no room for nuance. Good things are things the cult leader does and believes. Bad things are those are what outsiders do and think. At the end stage of thought mind control, members do not need to think for themselves because cult doctrine already explains and answers all questions.

Cults often incorporate their own language, another way to manipulate thinking and separate a member from an outsider. According to Hassan, using only certain words and avoiding others changes how humans think and perceive the world. The language of destructive cults is often simplistic, such as the "Cain-Abel problem" in the Unification Church. If a member had a difference of opinion with a mentor of higher up, they were told it was a Cain-Abel problem and that they (Cain) needed to submit instead of trying to oppose the leader (i.e., kill Abel). This was the only possible solution to the disagreement.

Destructive cults also teach members to "block out any information that is critical of the group." This can involve denial, rationalization, justification, and wishful thinking. Hassan also provides an example of his own blocking during his deprogramming, when he would sing hymns to prevent himself from hearing or thinking about what the ex-members were saying. Cults often explain criticism away in advance. In the Moonies, Hassan was told that criticism was lies from Satan. This turns outside criticism into a tool to strengthen the member's tie to the group, not weaken it.

An extreme form of thought control is thought stopping. Members are told to stop themselves from thinking bad thoughts and instead think only good and pure thoughts. When they think of something bad, they "center themselves" and block out the negativity, thus preventing any challenge to the cult, even in their own mind. Thought stopping techniques include praying, chanting, meditating, speaking in tongues, singing, and humming. Hassan stresses that, by themselves, these actions are not harmful. They become harmful when used by a destructive cult to program individuals to avoid any doubt or uncertainty.

If a member is effectively thought stopping, it is impossible to think negatively of the group or leader. Instead, any difficulty they have must be their own fault. This can lead members to working even harder. According to Hassan, when a cult controls someone's thoughts, it almost always controls feelings and behavior as well.

Emotion

Fears exploit feelings of contentedness and guilt and fear to maintain emotional control. By narrowing the range of emotions, Hassan describes how a cult can condition people to stay by making them feel wonderful when they are being obedient and guilty or scared when they make a mistake or disobey. Guilt can come from history, past actions, identity, or a social group. Because many cult members believe they are at fault if teachings do not make sense or work, when a cult leader points out their shortcomings, members blame themselves and feel more guilt. Hassan describes how a vacillation between praise and criticism is a common cult technique to manufacture helplessness, and called "double-bind behavior."

Fear binds groups together, first by creating a scary outside world that is persecuting group members, and then by creating a scary internal world, in which cult leaders may be moments away from discovering and punishing a member for not being good enough. For instance, some groups claim that if cult members don't work and believe hard enough, they will cause the apocalypse. Other groups use a thought control method of having members snitch on each other to increase the sense of fear. This "phobia indoctrination" makes members terrified of leaving or getting kicked out, convinced they will be go insane, be killed, etc.

Cults may also redefine emotions. Hassan describes a religious cult that teaches that happiness is being closer to God. Because it also teaches that God is unhappy, being unhappy and suffering are actually the truest form of happiness. Other cults teach that being happy is to follow the leader's direction and help the cult grow. Public confession is used to manipulate feelings of guilt and then blackmail members later. Though cults may promise that confessing leads to forgiveness, members are rarely forgiven and past transgressions may be brought up later to keep someone in line.

Many cults manipulate sexuality, either by banning sex and leading to frustration or by demanding it and calling members who refuse selfish. Destructive cults may also control love by dictating who can marry whom and who members can interact with. In the Moonies, Hassan describes how only their leader or a proxy could give a member permission to marry.

Three Steps of Mind Control
Hassan claims there are three steps to gaining control of someone's mind: unfreezing, changing, and refreezing. Unfreezing means "breaking a person down," changing is when indoctrination is introduced, and refreezing means building someone's new artificial cult identity.

Unfreezing can be induced physically, by depriving someone of sleep or food, by changing their diet, or by overloading their senses; mentally, such as by being intentionally confusing and contradictory; or emotionally, by making people feel like they are not the best judges of their own needs or that by leaving the group, they are giving up on an opportunity to change their lives. Hassan notes that unfreezing is best done in private, such as on the three-day weekend trip he took to the Unification Church commune, but can be done in more public spaces. However, it is generally important not to allow people alone time to think and reflect. As such, unfreezing is often done in groups.

During the change phase, the cult doles out the new identity. They do this through repetitive motions or lectures and seminars focused on the same topic, such as how bad the world is and how only the enlightened can fix it. Other cult members play an important role in identity indoctrination by creating a sense of community. These communities can then enforce behaviors using praise and shunning. When he was with the Moonies, Hassan describes how they separated recruits into sheep and goats, sectioning the goats off into their own group or asking them to leave lest they dissuade the sheep from joining.

According to Hassan, the most important part of refreezing is the denigration of the past self. Cult members must not want to return to their old lives and old identity. This may include giving up on their old hobbies, friends and family, often in a public setting, and confessing their sins to the group. Members may have distorted memories during this phase. Cults often pair new recruits with more seasoned members, instructing the new ones to imitate the older ones in all things. In this phase, cults may use outside cues like a new name, clothes, or language to cement the new identity. New members are also quickly converted into recruiters, as convincing people to believe something actually cements one's own belief in the same thing.

The entire cycle of indoctrination may be repeated over several years.

Reception
The book has been reviewed in the American Journal of Psychiatry. Louis Jolyon West writes:One is impressed by Hassan's candor in describing his experiences both within the Unification Church and after his departure from it, especially his work as an exit counselor. Beyond its value as an illuminating personal account, this book is an informative and practical guide to cult-related issues. It is recommended both to lay persons who wish to become better informed on this topic and to professionals in health-related fields, clergy, attorneys, judges, and others whose responsibilities bring them into contact with cults, their members, and the families whose lives are affected.Others have take positive views of his work as well. For example, Stephen Barrett, writing for the National Council Against Health Fraud Newsletter, believes that the book is an "insightful look at the bizarre and dangerous world of cults". Marcia R. Rudin writes that Combating Mind Control is a good revision of his previous work, especially the addition of "valuable" personal anecdotes from Hassan himself.

Some reviewers have a more mixed perspective on Hassan's book. Robert E. Schecter thinks that Combatting Cult Mind Control is a "jargon-free explanation of the nature and effects of mind control" and a "serviceable set of guidelines" about how to assist exiting cults. However, he believes that Hassan left out important details like how "push" factors influence one's vulnerability to being recruited in a cult.

Colorado state counselor Dr. Cathleen A. Mann said Hassan's BITE model "is borrowed material from a 30 year long tradition of social psychological research." She also noted that Hassan himself works for a for-profit, anti-cult institute, as opposed to a non-profit one, and opted to self-publish (through his company's publishing house) Combating Cult Mind Control instead of seeking a more traditional route.
 
John B. Brown II of the "Pagan Unity Campaign" criticized a policy stated in the book (page 114) which says that although Hassan had "decided not to participate in forcible interventions, believing it was imperative to find another approach". "Forcible intervention can be kept as a last resort if all other attempts fail," according to the 1988 Combating edition. Brown states that this indicates that Hassan advocates resorting to a forcible intervention if all other attempts fail.

According to Douglas Cowan, in this book Hassan utilizes a language opposing "freedom" and "captivity", based on the conceptual framework of brainwashing and thought control, and the alleged abuses of civil liberties and human rights. He writes that these are the precipitating motivation for secular anti-cultists such as Hassan.

Irving Hexham, professor of religious studies at the University of Calgary, writes that Hassan's description of destructive cults (page 37), as "a group which violates the rights of its members and damages them through the abusive techniques of unethical mind control" is not helpful as he fails to describe how to decide if a group is a cult or not, what are "abusive techniques" and what is "mind control".

See also
Anti-cult movement
List of cult and new religious movement researchers
Steven Hassan

References

1988 non-fiction books
2015 non-fiction books
Books about cults
Books about mind control